Malakwal is a city in Mandi Bahauddin District, Punjab, Pakistan.

History
In 997 CE, Sultan Mahmud Ghaznavi, took over the Ghaznavid dynasty empire established by his father, Sultan Sebuktegin. In 1005, he conquered the Shahis in Kabul, and followed it up by the conquests of Punjab region. The Delhi Sultanate and later Mughal Empire ruled the region. The Punjab region became predominantly Muslim due to missionary Sufi saints whose dargahs dot the landscape of Punjab region.

After the formation of the Sikh Empire in 1801, Malakwal was invaded and occupied by the Sikhs. During the period of British rule, Malakwal increased in population and importance.

The predominantly Muslim population supported Muslim League and Pakistan Movement. After the independence of Pakistan in 1947, the minority Hindus and Sikhs migrated to India while the Muslims refugees from India settled down here.

City information 
Malakwal lies on the south/east bank of river Jhelum and is sandwiched between River Jehlam and Lower Jehlam Canal. It is a tehsil and sub-divisional headquarter of Mandi Bahauddin District of province Punjab, Pakistan. It has a moderate climate. During the peak of a summer day, the temperature rises to 40 °C, and falls to 2 °C in the months of December and January.

Malakwal is situated on Shahpur - Mandi Bahauddin highway.

Malakwal has a railway station that is also a junction. There are boys' and girls' degree colleges available for both boys and girls.

Bar Musa, Gojra, Miana Gondal, Rukkan and Busal are the big towns of Malakwal Tehsil. Bar Musa is a famous town in this tehsil.

Malakwal is also known for the Daffer forest and Mona Depot, an Army remount for horses, this Mona Depot was named after the village Mona.

References

Cities and towns in Mandi Bahauddin District